Luis Carlos Martínez Méndez (born 11 December 1995) is a Guatemalan swimmer.

General 
2019 Pan American silver medalist 100 meter butterfly

2016 Olympian (Guatemala)

2015-2017 World Championships qualifier

3x NCAA All-American

Professional career (2019-   ) 

 Won the silver medal in the 100 meters butterfly, imposing a new games record in the preliminary heats at the 2019 Pan American Games (Lima, Peru).
 Toyota U.S. Open 1st place in the 100 meters butterfly (Atlanta, Georgia).
Qualified to Tokyo 2020 Olympic Games.

College career 
The following are Martínez's career timings in his college career:

• School's 6th-fastest performer with the 9th-fastest performance (45.72) in the 100 fly. Recorded 4 of the 22-fastest times in program history

• School's 10th-fastest performer (1:43.56) in the 200 fly

Senior Season (2017–18)

• NCAA All-American as part of the 11th-place 200 free relay, swimming the anchor leg

• Competed at NCAAs in the 100 fly (46.21/28th), 200 fly (1:44.48/37th) and 50 free (19.89/44th)

• Swam a personal best 100 fly (45.72) at the Bulldog Invite, which made him the 6th-fastest performer with the 9th-fastest performance in school history

• Finished 7th in the 100 fly (46.28), 20th in the 100 free (19.90) and 22nd in the 200 fly (1:45.64) at SECs

• Swept the fly events at the Texas A&M and Alabama dual meets

• Also won the 100 fly at the Tennessee & Wisconsin double dual meet
• Swam on a pair of winning relays during the dual meet season

Summer 2017

• Swam for Guatemala at the 2017 World Championships in Budapest
• Finished 18th in the 50m fly in 23.71, a new Guatemalan record

• Finished 21st in the 100 fly in 52.18, a new Guatemalan record
• Finished 37th in the 200 fly (2:03.10)

Junior Season (2016–17)

• Earned NCAA All-America honors as a part of the 200 and 400 medley relay teams

• Competed at NCAAs in the 100 fly (45.92/17th) and 200 fly (1:46.53/40th)

• Finished 5th in the 100 fly (46.03) at SECs

• Also placed 10th in the 200 fly (1:43.56) and 27th in the 200 IM (1:47.76) at SECs

• Swept the fly events at the Wisconsin, LSU, Alabama and Tennessee dual meets and won the 100 fly at the Texas dual meet

Sophomore Season (2015–16)

• 2016 Olympian for his native Guatemala

• Clocked a personal-best and national record 52.22 to finish 19th at the Olympics

• Qualified for the Olympics by placing third in the 100 fly (52.35) at the AT&T Winter Nationals in Federal Way, Wash.

• NCAA participant in the 100 fly (46.83/30th) and 200 fly (1:47.21/41st)
• Personal-bests in both the 100 fly (46.22) and 200 fly (1:44.72) came during SEC prelims

• SEC 100 fly prelims time is 8th-fastest in Auburn history
• Won the 100 fly during the Indiana (47.95), Florida (54.09 - LCM) and Texas (47.45) dual meets

Freshman Season (2014–15)

• Joined the team in January 2015 after transferring from Missouri S&T

• Recorded the third-best time on the team in the 100 fly at 47.09 to pick up an NCAA 'B' cut, but did not earn an invite to the NCAA meet

• Took 15th overall in the 100 fly at the SEC Championships, touching in at 47.09

• Was 30th in the 200 fly at the SEC meet with a time of 1:48.03 and placed 36th in the 500 freestyle with a PR time of 4:26.64

• Swam in his first dual meet of his Auburn career against Texas

He competed at the 2016 Summer Olympics in the Men's 100 metre butterfly event; his time of 52.22 seconds finished him 19th in the heats but did not qualify him for the semifinals.

References

External links

1995 births
Living people
Guatemalan male swimmers
Olympic swimmers of Guatemala
Swimmers at the 2016 Summer Olympics
Swimmers at the 2015 Pan American Games
Swimmers at the 2019 Pan American Games
Pan American Games medalists in swimming
Pan American Games silver medalists for Guatemala
Central American and Caribbean Games medalists in swimming
Central American and Caribbean Games gold medalists for Guatemala
Competitors at the 2018 Central American and Caribbean Games
Medalists at the 2019 Pan American Games
Sportspeople from Guatemala City
Swimmers at the 2020 Summer Olympics
Auburn Tigers men's swimmers